Valensia (released in Japan as Gaia) is a 1993 album by Dutch singer Valensia Clarkson. It is Valensia's debut album. The album features Robby Valentine on grand piano ("Nathalie", "T'Kylah", "My Heart Is In Your Hands", "Gaia") and Emmy Verhey on violin ("T'Kylah II", "Gaia").

Track listing
 "Tere"
 "The Sun"
 "Scaraboushka"
 "Nathalie"
 "Tango Tamara"
 "T'Kylah II"
 "T'kylah"
 "Megalomania"
 "My Heart Is In Your Hands"
 "Mr. 1999"
 "Gaia"
 "1997"

References

1993 debut albums
Valensia albums
Mercury Records albums